Ode to Mingus is an album by the American jazz drummer Dannie Richmond recorded in 1979 and released on the Italian Soul Note label.

Reception
The Allmusic review by Scott Yanow awarded the album 4 stars stating "Throughout the date, Richmond's drumming (which is showcased on the brief solo piece "Olduval Gorge") is heard in prime form".

Track listing
All compositions by Dannie Richmond except as indicated
 "Ode to Mingus" - 18:19 
 "Olduvai Gorge" - 2:46 
 "Love Bird" - 9:11 
 "If You Could See Me Now" (Tadd Dameron, Carl Sigman) - 3:11 
 "Drum Some, Some Drum" - 7:47
Recorded at Barigozzi Studio in Milano, Italy on November 23 & 24, 1979

Personnel
Dannie Richmond – drums
Bill Saxton – tenor saxophone
Danny Mixon – piano
Mike Richmond – bass

References

Black Saint/Soul Note albums
Dannie Richmond albums
1979 albums
Charles Mingus tribute albums